Luiza Jesus Prado, known as Hifa Cybe is a transdisciplinary artist  born in Guaratingueta, Brazil, in 1988. She uses artistic tools such as photography, performance, video art, installation, sculpture, painting, new media, body art, music and drawing along with physics, psychology, neuroscience and philosophy. Her research is specifically on memory. She explores topics of violence, sexual trauma, sociopolitical issues and minorities within Latin America. She has been mentioned as a feminist artist in FFW, Gedelés and O Grito. In 2014, her work "Corpo Estranho" was cataloged in the Portuguese book Evocations of Performance Art – Paco Editorial and since 2010 has been featured in Playboy Magazine, Digital Photographer and Efêmero Concreto'' among others.

Discography 
 2020: Social Esotropia
 2017: Poteh Pehuono
 2017: Funk Pesadão
 2016: Tumor Militar

Filmography 
 2014: Reincarnate Project

References 

Queer artists
Brazilian women artists
Brazilian photographers
Brazilian video artists
Brazilian performance artists
Brazilian LGBT photographers
1988 births
Living people